The 1995 Tampa Bay Buccaneers season was the franchise's 20th season in the National Football League (NFL).

The season began with the team trying to improve on a 6–10 season in 1994, a season in which the team won 4 straight games at the end of the year, and four of their final five. It was Sam Wyche’s final season as the team's head coach.

Prior to the season Malcolm Glazer took over ownership of the team, then the Bucs drafted defensive lineman Warren Sapp and linebacker Derrick Brooks, both of whom are recognized as two of the team's greatest ever players. The Buccaneers' first-ever draft pick, Lee Roy Selmon, was inducted into the Pro Football Hall of Fame.

Overview
There had been rumors as far back as the end of the 1993 season that new owner Glazer, who purchased the team from the estate of the late Hugh Culverhouse, would move the team after funding to improve Tampa Stadium was not obtained, but a referendum kept the Bucs in Tampa for 1995. The possibility of moving the Buccaneers to Cleveland, Ohio was an undercurrent throughout the 1995 season once Art Modell’s relocation of the Browns to Baltimore was announced.

Bucs Head coach Sam Wyche gained some notoriety for saying "Five dash Two" to reporters during a press conference after the seventh game of the season, referring to the team's 5–2 record at the time. Tampa Bay had won 9 of its previous 12 games, going back to the end of the 1994 season, and many observers felt they had become a sleeper NFC playoff contender. However, the good luck and victory string soon ran out, and the team would go 2–7 for the remainder of the season.

Following the week seven overtime win over Minnesota, Tampa Bay lost three in a row before beating expansion Jacksonville, only after Jaguars coach Tom Coughlin decided to go for a 2-point conversion when scoring a last-minute touchdown. It failed and the Bucs won 17–16, giving them a sweep of that season's new expansion teams, as they had beaten Carolina 17–10 in week 5. Two more losses followed, and the 6–7 Buccaneers had a prime time ESPN Sunday Night Football game against the Green Bay Packers, who were playing without future Hall of Fame defensive end Reggie White due to injury. Tampa Bay pulled out an overtime win over the eventual NFC Central champion Packers to make their record 7–7, ensuring that their streak of 10-loss seasons—dating back to the 1983 season—would end. The Buccaneers had remained in playoff contention through fourteen games for the first time in a 16-game season since 1981, when they won their second division championship in three seasons under coach John McKay and quarterback Doug Williams. (the Buccaneers qualified for the expanded playoff tournament during the strike-shortened 1982 season, their last postseason appearance until 1997).

The Bucs, however, lost to the Chicago Bears by 21 points at Soldier Field in the penultimate game of the season, ending their playoff hopes. In the season finale at home against a surging Detroit Lions team who were riding a six-game winning streak, Tampa lost decisively in a nationally televised Saturday game. The game became infamous due to a sideline argument between Wyche and quarterback Trent Dilfer; it was later revealed that Wyche planned to pull Dilfer for young backup quarterback Casey Weldon regardless of how the game was going, triggering Dilfer's furious reaction and also angering teammates of the very respected if inconsistent starter. The Buccaneers' overall passing attack in 1995 was anemic: they passed for the fifth-fewest yards in the league, had the second-worst team passer rating (60.3), and set an NFL record for fewest team touchdown passes (5) in a 16-game season.

Rumors also swirled that Wyche, knowing he would be let go by new owners without a winning record after a 5–2 start, ordered the team to wear orange jerseys and orange pants for the season finale (which at the time, would have been a first to wear the same colored top and bottom other than white), but after several players refused to wear it, the idea was scrapped. New owner Malcolm Glazer decided Wyche's tenure as coach was done, and started the search for the next coach of the Buccaneers, a search that would bring in coach Tony Dungy, who would turn the Buccaneers into a perennial playoff team (a 54–42 record and four playoff appearances in six seasons with the Tampa Bay), and build the foundation for their first Super Bowl win in 2002.

Offseason

NFL Draft

Transactions
July 27: Tampa Bay signed linebacker Tommy Thigpen

Personnel

Staff

Roster

Regular season

Schedule

Notes:
Division opponents in bold text

 = blacked out locally

Standings

References

External links
 Buccaneers on Pro Football Reference

Tampa Bay Buccaneers season
Tampa Bay Buccaneers
20th century in Tampa, Florida
Tampa Bay Buccaneers seasons